Christiaan Smit (born ) is a South African rugby union player for the  in the Pro14. His regular position is centre or fly-half.

Smit joined the  prior to the 2019–20 Pro14 season.

References

South African rugby union players
Living people
1995 births
Rugby union fly-halves
Rugby union centres
Griquas (rugby union) players
Cheetahs (rugby union) players
Free State Cheetahs players
Bulls (rugby union) players